The first elections to the Ceredigion County Council were held on 4 May 1995. In the sense that the borders were identical, the election followed the 1991 election for Ceredigion District Council. It was followed by the 1999 election.

Overview
As was the case with the previous authority, the Independents were the largest group with a number of councillors elected unopposed

Boundaries
The boundaries were identical to those used since 1987 for elections to the previous Ceredigion District Council.

Candidates
In addition to retiring members of the Ceredigion District Council a number of members of Dyfed County Council also sought election.

Ward results

Aberaeron (one seat)

Aberporth (one seat)

Aberystwyth East (two seats)

Aberystwyth North (two seats)

Aberystwyth South (two seats)

Aberystwyth West (two seats)

Beulah (one seat)

Borth (one seat)

Capel Dewi (one seat)

Cardigan (three seats)

Ceulanamaesmawr (one seat)

Ciliau Aeron (one seat)

Faenor (one seat)

Lampeter (two seats)

Llanarth (one seat)
The sitting district councillor, elected as an Independent in 1991 but as an Alliance candidate in 1987 stood down. Rheinallt Evans, a county councillor since 1985, was defeated.

Llanbadarn Fawr (two seats)

Llandyfriog (one seat)

Llandysiliogogo (one seat)

Llandysul Town (one seat)

Llanfarian (one seat)

Llanfihangel Ystrad (one seat)

Llangeitho (one seat)

Llangybi (one seat)

Llanrhystud (one seat)

Llansantffraed (one seat)

Llanwenog (one seat)

Lledrod (one seat)

Melindwr (one seat)

New Quay (one seat)

Penbryn (one seat)

Penparc (one seat)

Tirymynach (one seat)

Trefeurig (one seat)

Tregaron (one seat)

Troedyraur (one seat)

Ystwyth one seat)

By-elections 1995-99

Aberaeron 1996
A by-election was held in the Aberaeron ward following the resignation of Independent councillor Wyn Lewis.

Llanfihangel Ystrad 1998
A by-election was held in the Llanfihangel Ystrad ward following the death of Liberal Democrat councillor Huw Lloyd-Williams.

References

1995
1995 Welsh local elections
20th century in Ceredigion